Desmacididae is a family of sponges belonging to the order Poecilosclerida.

Genera:
 Desmacidon Bowerbank, 1861
 Desmapsamma Burton, 1934

References

Poecilosclerida